Eileen Margaret Logan (née Eileen Fadden) (1930-2015) was an English international lawn bowler.

Bowls career
Logan became the British singles champion after winning the British Isles Bowls Championships in 1979, when bowling for England and the Bounds Green Bowls Club. She qualified for the event by virtue of winning the English singles crown the previous year.

References

1930 births
2015 deaths
English female bowls players